Judgment of the Mad is a 1961 Soviet drama film directed by Grigori Roshal.

Plot 
The film takes place in Germany in the 1930s. The film tells about a scientist named Johannes Werner, who discovered the rays of the life-giving force. To prevent the use of the invention as a weapon, he destroys it and goes to the United States, where he is hiding under an assumed name. Suddenly he is offered to visit the military-industrial concern to show him a new European invention. He agrees and meets there his former pupil, who managed to recreate Werner's device and appropriated it to himself.

Cast 
 Vasily Livanov - Johannes Werner
 Irina Skobtseva - Susie Harrer
 Viktor Khokhryakov - Siegfried Gruber
 Olga Krasina - Clare

References

External links 
  (Nb - the IMDb entry is very incomplete and disagrees with the Russian-language sources)

1961 films
1960s Russian-language films
Soviet drama films
1961 drama films